Elise Aun (15 July 1863 – 2 June 1932) was an Estonian poet and writer; one of the most notable women writers in 19th-century Estonia.

Elise Rosalie Aun was born in Pikareinu, Valgjärve Parish (now, Kanepi Parish), Põlva County in 1863. In 1882, she graduated from Räpina Parish Girls' School. After graduating, she was unable to find steady work and did different small jobs in 1880s and 1890s. In 1902, she became an outlet manager for the Christian Popular Literature Agency in Tallinn. In 1903, she married schoolteacher Friedrich Raup.

Works
 1888 poetry collection "Kibuvitsa õied" ('Rosehip Blossoms')
 1890 poetry collection "Laane linnuke" ('Forest Bird')
 1890 poetry collection "Metsalilled" 'Forest Flowers'
 1895 poetry collection "Kibuvitsa õied II" ('Rosehip Blossoms II')
 1901 poetry collection "Kibuvitsa õied III" ('Rosehip Blossoms III')

References

External links
 Elise Aun at Estonian Writers' Online Dictionary

1863 births
1932 deaths
Estonian women poets
19th-century Estonian women writers
20th-century Estonian women writers
19th-century Estonian poets
20th-century Estonian poets
People from Kanepi Parish